The Archivists is a 2020 Canadian short drama film, directed by Igor Drljaca. Set in a dystopian future in which all art from the past has been banned, the film centres on William (Noah Reid), Serena (Bahia Watson) and Samuel (Maxwell McCabe-Lokos), an itinerant trio of musicians who happen on a secret room whose contents include an old vinyl record and a phonograph, and are inspired to perform a rendition of one of the album's songs after listening to it.

The film premiered at the 2020 Toronto International Film Festival.  It was subsequently named to TIFF's year-end Canada's Top Ten list for short films in 2020.

References

External links

2020 films
2020 short films
Films directed by Igor Drljaca
2020 drama films
2020s English-language films
Canadian drama short films
2020s Canadian films